TA Benchamarachuthit Football Club (Thai ทีเอ เบญจมราชูทิศ) is a Thai new semi professional football club based in Tha Chang District of Chanthaburi Province. They currently play in Regional League Division 2 Central & Eastern in 2016.

Stadium and locations

Season By Season Record

External links
 Official Facebookpage of TA Benchamarachuthit

Association football clubs established in 2013
Football clubs in Thailand
Chanthaburi province
2016 establishments in Thailand